Paraenhydrocyon ("beside Enhydrocyon") is an extinct genus of bone crushing omnivorous early canid which inhabited North America during the Early Miocene, 24.8—20.4 Ma, existing for approximately .

The dentition suggests that this animal was a hypercarnivore or mesocarnivore. In addition to its retention of several primitive cranial characters, this includes unique sharp-tipped, slender premolars that clearly contrast with the strong premolars of the Mesocyon–Enhydrocyon group, but also parallels that clade by having a reduced metaconid cusp on the lower molars.

References

Hesperocyonines
Oligocene canids
Aquitanian genus extinctions
Prehistoric mammals of North America
Prehistoric carnivoran genera
Rupelian genus first appearances